Mangaliso Mtiya is a South African cricketer. He made his List A debut for Boland in the 2016–17 CSA Provincial One-Day Challenge on 30 October 2016. He made his first-class debut for Boland in the 2016–17 Sunfoil 3-Day Cup on 24 November 2016.

References

External links
 

Year of birth missing (living people)
Living people
South African cricketers
Boland cricketers
Place of birth missing (living people)